This article describes the many variations of the Colt AR-15 and M16 rifle family of weapons produced by Colt's Manufacturing Company.  Weapons patterned on the original ArmaLite AR-15 design have been produced by numerous manufacturers and have been used by nations around the world, some of which created their own variations.  The tables here are split in a variety of categories, and provide an overview of different subtypes. For purposes of these tables, bold model numbers are weapons used (or previously used) by the U.S. Military while italic model numbers are weapons for commercial or export sale. See Glossary of terms for an explanation of each column.

Colt military models
Colt has been the most visible producer of ArmaLite AR-15 pattern weapons, and the military designations M16 and M4 are heavily associated with the company. Colt has an intricate internal nomenclature system for its models, with a variety of suffixes and prefixes. Colt's systems have generally followed the times and though its model numbers originally came without prefixes, with the need to separate weapons made for civilian consumption from those made for military and law enforcement use, military models became prefixed with the code "R0". For the purposes of this table, the R0 nomenclature is obviated as this terminology did not exist in all cases, but it can be understood to be present. Military/LE models are also easily identified by their three digit code in contrast to the four digit codes for civilian weapons.

Colt Armalite AR-15
The original Armalite AR-15 models have the charging handle located on top of the upper receiver, protected within the carrying handle.

Colt M16 Rifle, M4 Carbine based weapons

Colt military models without model numbers
In rare instances some Colt models have been produced without in house model numbers, or at least one which is readily apparent.

Diemaco/Colt Canada models
The Canadian company Colt Canada (formerly Diemaco) licensed production of a rifle (Colt Model 715) and carbine (Colt Model 725), but later went on to produce an entire line of AR-15/M16 pattern weapons developed independently.  In May 2005, Colt's Manufacturing Company acquired Diemaco, and the name was changed to Colt Canada.

Non-factory military models

Colt civilian models
Colt's civilian line of semi-automatic Colt AR-15 rifles is identified by a four digit code following a specific prefix.  Initially all Colt civilian weapons were listed with an “R” prefix, with this changing to “AR” following the passage of the Federal Assault Weapons Ban in 1994.  Colt also produced a line of weapons aimed at target shooters under the “MT” prefix, which stood for Match Target, as well as, the Colt Accurized Rifle, which was the only model to feature the CR prefix.  Most recently with the shift in marketing policy by Colt Defense, these weapons have been given the “LE” and "LT" prefix. The "LT" series is modified version of the Colt 6720 featuring a lightweight "pencil" barrel with a free floating rail system. Only 1500 of the "LT" series were produced. Currently, Colt Defense has no line targeted specifically at the private civilian market.

R series models

AR series models

MT and CR series models

LE series models

LT series models

Glossary of terms

Stock
Fixed Stocks
A1: Fixed stock as used on M16 and M16A1. May or may not have a trapdoor to store a cleaning kit
A2: Improved stock used on M16A2. Longer by 5/8"
Tubular: Fixed tubular buttstock, similar to the 2nd Generation retractable unit, using a receiver extension and triangular rear with buttplate

Retractable Stocks
1st Generation: 2-position sliding stock that resembled a shortened fixed buttstock
2nd Generation: 2-position aluminum retractable stock
3rd Generation: 2-position fiberlite retractable stock.  Introduced 1985
Canadian 3rd Generation: 4-position fiberlite retractable stock fitted with rubber buttpad 
4th Generation: 4-position nylon retractable stock.  Introduced 2002, designed by Picatinny Arsenal engineer Lily Ko with reinforced ribs, an angled buttplate, and a rear sling swivel
Retractable ACR: Similar in design to the so-called "Crane Stock" (initially fabricated by the Naval Surface Warfare Center Crane Division) essentially a 3rd generation unit with integrated cheek-rest
FPW Wire: Retractable wire stock similar in appearance to the stock used on the M3 submachine gun
Israeli: Rebuilt 3rd Generation stocks with 6 positions instead of 2

Handguards
Triangular: Triangular rifle handguards
Short Triangular: Carbine length triangular handguards
Round: Smooth round rifle handguards 
Short Round: Carbine length smooth round handguard
Ribbed: Ribbed round rifle handguards
Short Ribbed: Carbine length ribbed handguards
Square LMG: Special heavy handguards with integral vertical grip for use during sustained fire
FF Tube: Free-Float Tube
M4: Oval carbine handguards with double heatshields
Rail/RIS: Handguards are replaced with a Rail Integration System.
Monolithic Rail Platform (MRP): A variant Rail System made by LMT. It has a free-floating barrel for greater accuracy.
ACR Type: Advanced Combat Rifle Project Handguard

Fire control
S-1: The selector is Safe (S) – Semi-Automatic (1)
S-F: The selector is Safe (S) – Fully Automatic (F)
S-1-F: The selector is Safe (S) – Semi-Automatic (1) – Fully Automatic (F)
S-1–3: The selector is Safe (S) – Semi-Automatic (1) – 3-Round Burst (3)
S-F-1–3: The selector is Safe (S) – Fully Automatic (F) – Semi-Automatic (1) – 3-Round Burst (3).  First Generation 4 position group
S-1–3-F: The selector is Safe (S) – Semi-Automatic (1) – 3-Round Burst (3) – Fully Automatic (F).  Second Generation 4 position group

Rear sight
A1: "Field sights" in which the rear sight is only adjustable for windage
A2: Rear sight adjustable for both windage and elevation
Flattop: Indicates carry handle and rear sight has been replaced with a MIL-STD-1913 rail. A detachable carry handle can be attached to the rail which features either A1 (Diemaco/Colt Canada) or A2 (Colt) sights
Weaver: Indicates carry handle and rear sight has been replaced with a Weaver-type rail. A detachable carry handle can be attached to the rail which features either A1 (Diemaco/Colt Canada) or A2 (Colt) sights

Barrel Profile
ArmaLite Early ArmaLite AR-15 ultra-lightweight 'Hollywood' turned-down profile barrel, 1:14 twist only  
A1: Also referred to as the "lightweight" or "pencil" profile.  Government-specified barrel profile increased to between 0.675 and 0.575 inches
A2: Also referred to as the "government" or "gov't" profile. Barrel profile for which the portion of the barrel in front of handguards is thickened to 0.715 inches
HBAR: A barrel that in some portion is thicker than government-profile, usually underneath the handguards
M4: Government barrel profile with small portion reduced to 0.575 inches to mount M203 grenade launcher
M4 HBAR: M4 barrel with portion under handguard thickened for sustained automatic fire
Super Heavy: Special Colt bull target/match barrel
SFW: Special Forces Weapon profile, A2 profile with "fat" portion forward of the sight triangle

Barrel twist
Note: Metric measurements are rounded upwards to the nearest digit.
1:14: 1 right hand twist every 14 inches (356 mm) .222 Remington or .223 Remington (US M193)
1:12: 1 right hand twist every 12 inches (305 mm) .223 Remington (US M193) or 7.62×39mm
1:10: 1 right hand twist every 10 inches (254 mm) 9×19mm NATO
1:9: 1 right hand twist every 9 inches (229 mm) .223 Remington & 5.56×45mm NATO
1:7: 1 right hand twist every 7 inches (178 mm) 5.56×45mm NATO (NATO SS109 & US M855)

Muzzle device
Type 1 Duckbill: Original three-prong flash hider
Type 2 Duckbill: Also referred to as "three prong." A larger three-prong flash hider
A1 or A1 Birdcage: Also referred to as Birdcage flash hider
A2 or A2 Compensator: Birdcage flash hider with bottom slots closed off to act as muzzle compensator and to prevent dust from being blown into the shooters face while in the prone position
3.5" Moderator or 4.5" Moderator: Either the 3.5-inch or 4.5-inch baffled moderators
Conical: A conical flash suppressor
ACR Compensator: Special anti-rise muzzle device developed specifically for the Colt ACR
Factory Compensator: Colt Factory muzzle brake compliant with the restrictions of the 1994 Federal Assault Weapons Ban

References

Bibliography

  
 Dockery, Kevin (1997). Special Warfare Special Weapons.  Chicago, IL: Emperor's Press.  .
 Gervasi, Tom (1984). Arsenal of Democracy III: America's War Machine, the Pursuit of Global Dominance.  New York: Grove Press.  .
 Long, Duncan (2001).  The Complete AR-15/M16 Sourcebook.  Boulder, CO: Paladin Press.  .

See also
 M16
 M231 Firing Port Weapon
 M4 Carbine
 CAR-15
 Colt Automatic Rifle

5.56 mm firearms
ArmaLite AR-10 derivatives
Assault rifles
Colt firearms
Colt rifles
Firearms of the United States
Rifles of the United States
Semi-automatic rifles